The Labour Party was a political party in Indonesia. It had its origins in the Indonesian Prosperous Laborers organization (SBSI), which in 1993 threw its support behind the Indonesian Democratic Party (PDI) as a vehicle for its political aspirations. When the PDI split in 1996, it allied itself with the breakaway faction led by Megawati Sukarnoputri, which led to it coming under pressure from the New Order government of President Suharto. On 30 July 1996, SBSI chairman Muchtar Pakpahan was detained on subversion charges. Following the fall of Suharto in 1998, the SBSI became disillusions with Megawati's now renamed Indonesian Democratic Party – Struggle and decided to establish its own party, the National Labour Party. After the failure in 1999 election, the party changed its name to Social Democrat Labour Party. The party stood in the 2004 Indonesian legislative election, but won only 0.6 percent of the vote and no legislative seats. Party chairman However, the party has 12 representatives in provincial assemblies. The party subsequently changed its name to the Labour Party.

After initially failing to qualify, following a lawsuit the party won the right to contest the 2009 elections. However, the party won only 0.25 percent of the vote, less than the 2.5 percent electoral threshold, meaning it was awarded no seats in the People's Representative Council.

On 5 October 2021, the party, together with other 10 Indonesian labour mass organizations re-formed into the newly reformed Labour Party.

Ballot number history
1999: 37 (as Partai Buruh Nasional)
2004: 2 (as Partai Buruh Sosial Demokrat)
2009: 44 (as Partai Buruh)

References

1998 establishments in Indonesia
Labour parties
Pancasila political parties
Political parties established in 1998
Socialist parties in Indonesia
Political parties disestablished in 2021
2021 disestablishments in Indonesia
Defunct political parties in Indonesia